The 1970s operation in Balochistan was a five-year military conflict in Balochistan, the largest province of Pakistan, between the Pakistan Army and Baloch separatists and tribesmen that lasted from 1973 to 1978.

The operation began in 1973 shortly after then-Pakistani President Zulfikar Ali Bhutto dismissed the elected provincial government of Balochistan on the pretext that arms had been discovered in the Iraqi Embassy, ostensibly for Baloch rebels. The ensuing protest against the dismissal of the duly elected government also led to calls for Balochistan's secession, met by Bhutto's ordering the Pakistan Army into the province. Akbar Khan Bugti served as provincial governor during the early stages of the conflict. The operation itself was led by General Tikka Khan against an unknown number of militants coordinated by their Baloch sardars, or tribal chiefs, most notably Khair Bakhsh Marri and Ataullah Mengal. Iran provided military support to the operation.

Fighting was intermittent throughout the conflict, climaxing in 1974 with drawn-out battles. The Bhutto regime was overthrown by General Zia-ul-Haq on 5 July 1977, and martial law was imposed. A general amnesty was declared by military governor Rahimuddin Khan. Army action ended by 1978, replaced by development and educational policies to conciliate the province.

The conflict took the lives of ~3,300 Pakistani troops, ~5,300 militants, and thousands of civilians. Most civilian casualties were inflicted by militants targeting local Baloch populations whom the militants believed were loyal to the government.

Calls for independence 

The 1971 civil war had ended with the defeat of Pakistan at the hands of Bangladesh and India. East Pakistan declared itself to be independent. It became a new sovereign state called Bangladesh, to be ruled by Bengali leader Shaikh Mujibur Rahman. Mujib had been a major personality in the events that had led to the war, having called for greater provincial autonomy and rights for what was then East Pakistan, only to be met with utter disapproval by the then military ruler Yahya Khan and his West Pakistan-based political opponent Zulfikar Ali Bhutto. Despite Mujib's having won the federal elections of 1970, both Yahya and Bhutto refused to let Mujib form the central government. The ensuing unrest gradually deteriorated into civil war, and ultimately the secession of Bangladesh after the India-Pakistan War of 1971. India also played a large part in the independence of Bangladesh by arming and financing the separatist group Mukti Bahini which rebelled against the Pakistani State after the injustice done to the then East Pakistan. Most importantly, India sent its troops into East Pakistan to aid the Bengali separatists in suppressing the Pakistan army.

This greatly influenced Balochistan's leading political party, the National Awami Party (NAP). Led by ethnic nationalists and feudal leaders such as Sardar Ataullah Mengal and Khan Wali Khan, the party dominated the province due to the large amount of individual political influence its leaders held. Emboldened by the secession of Bangladesh, the party demanded greater autonomy from Zulfikar Ali Bhutto, who had become the new President of Pakistan following his predecessor Yahya Khan's resignation in December 1971, in return for a consensual agreement on Bhutto's Pakistan Constitution of 1973. Bhutto, however, refused to negotiate on any terms that might have involved a reduction in his powers, with chief minister Ataullah Mengal in Quetta and Mufti Mahmud in Peshawar. The already significant civil unrest now turned volatile as tensions between the NAP and Bhutto erupted.

Launch of Bhutto's military operation 

The ethno-separatist rebellion of Balochistan of the 1970s, the most threatening civil disorder to Pakistan since Bangladesh's secession, now began. Surveying the political instability, Bhutto's central government sacked two provincial governments within six months, arrested the two chief ministers, two governors, forty-four Members of the National Assembly and Provincial Assembly, obtained an order from the Supreme Court banning the NAP, and charged everyone with high treason to be tried by a specially constituted Hyderabad Tribunal of handpicked judges. Following the alleged discovery of Iraqi arms in Islamabad in February 1973, Bhutto dissolved the Balochistan Provincial Assembly and infuriated Balochistan's political oligarchs.

In time, the nationalist insurgency, which had been steadily gathering steam, now exploded into action, with widespread civil disobedience and armed uprisings. Bhutto now sent in the army to maintain order and crush the insurgency. This essentially pitted the ethno-separatists against the central government. As casualties rose, the insurgency became a full-fledged armed struggle against the Pakistan Army. The sporadic fighting between the insurgency and the army started in 1973 with the largest confrontation taking place in September 1974 when around 15,000 ethno-separatists fought the Pakistan Army and Air Force. Sensing the seriousness of the conflict, the Pakistan Navy dispatched units under Vice-Admiral Patrick Simpson—Commander of the Southern Naval Command—to provide logistic and intelligence support to the Army and Air Force from the sea. The navy applied an effective blockade in Balochistan's waters and stopped the illegal arms trade and aid to Baloch rebel groups. In a separate operation, the navy seized and destroyed vessels that were trying to aid the Baloch rebel groups. The army suffered more than 3,000 casualties in the fight while the militants lost some 5,000 fighters as of 1977. After three years of fighting the separatists were running out of ammunition and so withdrew by 1976.

Foreign Support

India
Pakistan asserted India was covertly intervening in Balochistan in the same way it had intervened in East Pakistan before the secession of Bangladesh.  India denied the assertions, replying that it was fearful of further balkanisation of the subcontinent after Bangladesh. In retrospect, Avinash Paliwal, in his book My Enemy's Enemy: India in Afghanistan from the Soviet Invasion to the US Withdrawal, cites a junior Indian intelligence officer participant in these operations who recalled that "we gave Baloch everything, from money to guns, during the 1970s, everything". Paliwal further claims that just as Pakistan and India were bitter rivals, so were Iran and Iraq. In the pursuit of their respective rivalries, Pakistan and Iran developed closer relations, as did India and Iraq. Arming Baloch insurgents in Iran and Pakistan was in the interest of both Iraq and India. The militant group Pasthun Zalmay was responsible for a series of bomb blasts and other insurgent activities in Pakistan; it comprised Balochs and Pashtuns and was in direct contact with Kabul as well as with the Indian and Iraqi missions in Afghanistan. As a consequence, relations between Iran and India deteriorated so much that in 1975, Indian diplomat Ram D. Sathe sent a secret letter to the Indian ambassador in Tehran in which Sathe predicted that "it will be a few more days before the Iranians will stridently back the Pakistanis (on Kashmir) ... Personally I do not think we should be under any illusion about this matter. I think Iranians will definitely back the Pakistanis".

Iran
It was after visiting Iran in 1973 that President Zulfikar Ali Bhutto had dissolved Balochistan's provincial government in the run-up to the operation. When the operation was begun, Mohammed Reza Pahlavi, the Shah of Iran and Bhutto ally, feared a spread of Baloch ethnic resistance into Iran. The Imperial Iranian Army began providing Pakistan with military hardware and financial support. Among Iran's contributions were 30 HueyCobra attack helicopters and $200 million in aid.

Republic of Afghanistan
The Republic of Afghanistan under the leadership of Mohammed Daoud Khan provided covert support to Baloch militants. In the 1970s Daoud Khan had ordered the construction of military training camps for Baloch militants in Kabul and in Kandahar. Camps in Kabul were under the supervision and control of Republican Guards. Baloch militants were provided with arms, ammunition, and training in insurgent warfare so that they would fight against Pakistan.

End of action
Although major fighting had broken down, ideological schisms caused splinter groups to form and steadily gain momentum. On 5 July 1977, the Bhutto government was overthrown by General Zia-ul-Haq and martial law was imposed. With the civil disobedience in Balochistan remaining widespread, the military brought in Lieutenant General Rahimuddin Khan as governor under martial law. Rahimuddin declared a general amnesty for belligerents willing to give up arms and oversaw military withdrawal. Ataullah Mengal and Khair Bakhsh Marri, sardars that had been active in the conflict, were isolated by Rahimuddin from provincial affairs, and left the province for foreign countries. Marri later said the Baloch independence movement was 'at a virtual standstill', and Marri tribesmen granted amnesty laid down their arms. Akbar Bugti, having sided with Tikka Khan and now being marginalised by Rahimuddin Khan, went into self-imposed seclusion. Civil disobedience movements and anti-government protests died down.

Rahimuddin's tenure also ushered in sustained development. Following the Soviet invasion of neighbouring Afghanistan in 1979, Rahimuddin used the resultant foreign attention on Balochistan by introducing an externally financed development programme for the area. Forty million dollars (USD) were committed to the programme by the end of 1987, by which time Rahimuddin had resigned. He expedited the regulation of Pakistan Petroleum Limited, the exploration company charged with the Sui gas field. He consolidated the then-contentious integration of Gwadar into Balochistan, which had earlier been notified as a district in 1977. Addressing the province's literacy rate, the lowest in the country for both males and females, he administered the freeing up of resources towards education, created girls' incentive programs, and had several girls' schools built in the Dera Bugti District. As part of his infrastructure schemes, he also forced his way in extending electricity to vast areas with subsoil water.

Tensions have resurfaced in the province with the Pakistan Army being involved in attacks against ethnic Baloch separatist groups like the Balochistan Liberation Army, the Baloch Liberation Front and the Baloch Republican Army. Attempted uprisings have taken place as recently as 2006.

See also
 List of conflicts related to the Cold War

References

External links
 Balochistan Insurgency

Political repression in Pakistan
Naval operations involving Pakistan
Government of Zulfikar Ali Bhutto
Insurgency in Balochistan
Military history of Balochistan, Pakistan